Lookout Mountain is a town in Hamilton County, Tennessee, United States. The population was 2,058 at the 2020 census. Bordering its sister city of Lookout Mountain, Georgia to the south, Lookout Mountain is part of the Chattanooga, TN–GA Metropolitan Statistical Area.

Geography
Lookout Mountain is located at  (34.996442, -85.350810). According to the United States Census Bureau, the town has a total area of 1.3 square miles (3.3 km2), all of it land.

Demographics

2020 census

As of the 2020 United States census, there were 2,058 people, 737 households, and 557 families residing in the town.

2000 census
As of the census of 2000, there were 2,000 people, 791 households, and 586 families residing in the town. The racial makeup of the town was 96.90% White, 2.10% African American, 0.05% Native American, 0.50% Asian, 0.10% Pacific Islander, 0.05% from other races, and 0.30% from two or more races. Hispanic or Latino of any race were 0.40% of the population.

There were 791 households, out of which 35.3% had children under the age of 18 living with them, 66.9% were married couples living together, 6.3% had a female householder with no husband present, and 25.9% were non-families. 24.5% of all households were made up of individuals, and 13.3% had someone living alone who was 65 years of age or older. The average household size was 2.53 and the average family size was 3.03.

In the town, the population was spread out, with 28.1% under the age of 18, 4.3% from 18 to 24, 21.1% from 25 to 44, 27.6% from 45 to 64, and 19.0% who were 65 years of age or older. The median age was 43 years. For every 100 females, there were 90.8 males. For every 100 females age 18 and over, there were 85.8 males.

The median income for a household in the town was $100,782, and the median income for a family was $121,037. Males had a median income of $94,501 versus $37,917 for females. The per capita income for the town was $60,938, the third highest in the state. About 4.3% of families and 4.2% of the population were below the poverty line, including 1.6% of those under age 18 and 2.1% of those age 65 or over.

Points of interest
 Lookout Mountain Incline Railway
 Point Park and Lookout Mountain Battlefield

References

External links
Lookout Mountain tourism website

Lookout Mountain
Towns in Hamilton County, Tennessee
Towns in Tennessee
Chattanooga metropolitan area